Government House, also known as Springfield House, is the official residence of the governor-general of Saint Kitts and Nevis, current Dame Marcella Liburd.

History

In 1837, Sir Henry Blake sold the twenty-five acre lot to Thomas Harper who renamed it Springfield and built a house on it. Because the latter ran into debt, the property passed into the hands of Robert Sharry Harper trustee under the marriage settlement of Mary Sharry Harper née Amory.  When the archdeaconry of St Kitts was created as a consequence of the establishment of the Diocese of Antigua in 1842 it was felt that the rector of St George should be accommodated in a style more suitable for his new position of archdeacon. In keeping with this ambition Francis Robert Brathwaite, the first archdeacon, bought Springfield from the Harpers in September 1848. In 1855 Springfield house was conveyed in trust among other things for such public uses and purposes as from time to time should by the governor, Privy council and Assembly be declared and appointed. After repairs it was appointed as residence for then rector the Venerable Archdeacon Jermyn in 1856. The property served as the residence of successive Rectors until disestablishment in 1874.

In 1946, after much repair, Sir Frederick Albert Phillip, the then governor moved into the Springfield House.

Today, the Springfield House commonly known as the Government House of St. Kitts & Nevis is the Official Residence of the governor-general of The Federation of St. Kitts and Nevis.

See also
Government Houses of the British Empire
Governors General of Saint Kitts and Nevis

References

Official residences
Buildings and structures in Basseterre
Government of Saint Kitts and Nevis
Government Houses of the British Empire and Commonwealth
Saint Kitts and Nevis–United Kingdom relations